Salvia substolonifera is an annual plant that is native to Fujian, Guizhou, Hunan, Sichuan, and Zhejiang provinces in China, growing on streamsides, crevices, and forests at sea level to  elevation.

Inflorescences are 2-8 flowered verticillasters in axillary or terminal racemes or panicles, with a  reddish or purplish corolla.

Notes

substolonifera
Flora of Guizhou
Flora of Zhejiang